is a Japanese football player. He currently plays as a goalkeeper for Viengchanh.

Career
In 2015, Kochi joined Rakhine United F.C. for one season and left the club after the season was over.

In January 2017, he signed a contract with Maldivian football Club Green Streets, along with three Ukrainian footballers.

References

Japanese footballers
1983 births
Living people
Taiwan Football Premier League players
YSCC Yokohama players
Fujieda MYFC players
Albirex Niigata players
Jun Kochi
Jun Kochi
Jun Kochi
Jun Kochi
Rakhine United F.C. players
New Radiant S.C. players
Club Green Streets players
Taichung Futuro F.C. players
Japanese expatriate footballers
Expatriate footballers in Thailand
Expatriate footballers in Myanmar
Expatriate footballers in the Maldives
Association football goalkeepers